Nocardioides panacisoli is a Gram-positive,  non-spore-forming and rod-shaped bacterium from the genus Nocardioides which has been isolated from soil from a ginseng field in Pocheon, Korea.

References

External links
Type strain of Nocardioides panacisoli at BacDive -  the Bacterial Diversity Metadatabase	

panacisoli
Bacteria described in 2010